"First" is a song by American indie rock band Cold War Kids. The song was written by the band and produced by Lars Stalfors and Dann Gallucci. It was the second and final single off their fifth album Hold My Home (2014) and was released on February 17, 2015. The song garnered a positive reception from music critics.

"First" peaked at number 1 on the Billboard Alternative Songs chart, becoming the band's highest charting single. A music video was made for the single and was released on January 12, 2015. The song was certified Platinum by the RIAA for selling over 1,000,000 digital copies in the United States.

Critical reception
"First" received positive reviews from music critics. Philip Cosores of Paste called it a "clap-along anthem" and put it together with "All This Could Be Yours" and "Hot Coals" as "the strongest run the band has put together in its career." Heather Phares of AllMusic remarked the song being a highlight of the album due to its "anthemic power."

Music video
The music video was uploaded on the band's VEVO page on January 12, 2015.

Chart performance
The song spent seven weeks at number one on the Billboard Alternative Songs chart. It remains the band's only song to top that chart. The song stayed on the chart for sixty-four weeks, making it the third-longest-running single in the chart's history.

In popular culture
 The song was featured in the 2015 film Aloha.
 The song was featured in the season 5 episode "Denial" of the USA series Suits.
 The song was featured in the pilot episode of the ABC series Quantico.
 The song was used in a commercial for Coors Banquet.
 The song was used in a series of commercials for Hyundai promoting its 2019 lineup of electric and hybrid vehicles.

Charts

Weekly charts

Year-end charts

Certifications

See also
 List of number-one Billboard Alternative Songs of 2015

References

2014 songs
2015 singles
Cold War Kids songs
Downtown Records singles
V2 Records singles